Volney may refer to:

Comte de Volney or Constantin-François de Chassebœuf (1757–1820), French philosopher, historian, orientalist, and politician
Herbert Volney, a politician from Trinidad and Tobago
Volney, New York a town in Oswego County, New York, United States
Volney Prize, an award by the Institut de France

People with the given name
 Volney E. Howard (1809–1889), American lawyer, statesman, and jurist
 Volney Mathison, American experimenter in early biofeedback
 Volney Peters (born 1928), American football player in the NFL
 Volney Rogers (1846–1919), American lawyer
 Volney Morgan Spalding (1849–1918), American botanist
 Volney F. Warner (born 1926), retired United States Army four-star general